Jack Harper may refer to:

Jack Harper (1900s pitcher) (1878–1950), pitcher in Major League Baseball
Jack Harper (1915 pitcher) (1893–1927), American pitcher in Major League Baseball
Jack Harper (American football) (born 1944), former American college and professional football player
Jack Harper (Canadian football) (1927–?), Canadian Football League player
Jack Harper (tennis) (1914–2005), Australian tennis player
Jack Harper (footballer) (born 1996), Scottish footballer
Jack Harper (politician) (born 1967), American politician in Arizona

Fictional characters
Jack Harper (Tru Calling), a character in the television series Tru Calling
Jack Harper, the real identity of the Illusive Man in the Mass Effect video game series
Jack Harper (On the Buses), a character in the British sitcom On the Buses
Jack Harper, one of the main characters in the novel Can You Keep a Secret? by Sophie Kinsella
Dr. Jack Harper, a character in the 2007 film Awake, played by Terrence Howard
Jack Harper, the main protagonist in the 2013 film Oblivion, played by Tom Cruise

See also
John Harper (disambiguation)